Joseph C. Serra (born August 8, 1940) is an American politician who served in the Connecticut House of Representatives from the 33rd district from 1993 to 2021.

References

External links

1940 births
Living people
Democratic Party members of the Connecticut House of Representatives
21st-century American politicians
20th-century American politicians
People from Middletown, Connecticut
University of Hartford alumni